Vida por vida  is a Mexican telenovela produced by Telesistema Mexicano (now Televisa) in 1960. with episodes of 30 minutes duration. Under the direction of Rafael Banquells.

Plot 
The story tells of two women vying for the love of a man.

Cast 
 Jacqueline Andere as Tula
 Celia Manzano
 Miguel Manzano as Antonio
 Armando Calvo as Dr. Valcourt
 Mónica Serna as Chachita
 Juan Felipe Preciado as Andrés
 Gina Romand

References

External links 

1960 telenovelas
Mexican telenovelas
Televisa telenovelas
Television shows set in Mexico City
1960 Mexican television series debuts
1960 Mexican television series endings
Spanish-language telenovelas